The Joint Committee on Atomic Energy (JCAE) was a United States congressional committee that was tasked with exclusive jurisdiction over "all bills, resolutions, and other matters" related to civilian and military aspects of nuclear power from 1946 through 1977. It was established by the United States Atomic Energy Act of 1946, and was the overseer of the United States Atomic Energy Commission. It had been preceded by the Senate Special Committee on Atomic Energy, chaired by Senator Brien McMahon. For its broad powers, it is described as one of the most powerful congressional committees in U.S. history. It was the only permanent joint committee in modern times to have legislative authority.

The panel coupled these legislative powers with exclusive access to the information upon which its highly secretive deliberations were based. In particular its relations with the U.S. Department of Defense and the individual armed services were especially close. The joint committee was also entitled by statute to be kept "fully and currently informed" of all commission activities and vigorously exercised that statutory right, demanding information and attention from the executive branch in a fashion that arguably has no equivalent today.

During the early years of the Cold War, McMahon became the Senate's most prominent expert on atomic energy matters and as chairman exercised considerable influence towards increasing the focus on nuclear weapons as being essential to the American national interest. In this McMahon was aided by the executive director of the committee's staff, William L. Borden, who himself became a powerful figure. Senator Bourke Hickenlooper also served as chair during the early years of the committee and shared a similar sensibility. Indeed regardless of which party controlled the committee, the push for increased production of nuclear materials, and a resultant increase in the American nuclear stockpile, continued.

One major power wielded by the JCAE was the "Legislative Veto". This unique power enabled the JCAE to influence policy decisions while matters were pending. This enabled the JCAE to act as a co-decision maker with the executive branch rather than only providing congressional oversight of actions that had already occurred. The legislative veto power was later found to be unconstitutional by the United States Supreme Court in 1983.

This committee was the main opponent to the creation of the EPA. The Ash Council addressed its resistance to interference by proposing to only transfer over to the new agency the responsibilities of setting radiation standards outside of nuclear power plants.

The JCAE had various subcommittees including Agreements for Cooperation, Communities, Legislation, Military Application, National Security, Raw Materials, Radiation (Special), and Research and Development.

During the 1970s, the committee's role in shaping nuclear policy began to diminish after the Nuclear Regulatory Commission was created to replace the Atomic Energy Commission. Congress soon transferred the bulk of the joint committee's jurisdiction over civilian nuclear power to other standing congressional committees in the House and Senate. The joint committee was finally abolished on August 5, 1977.

Prominent members

Brien McMahon (D-CT), 1946–52: Senator who was legislative author of the Atomic Energy Act of 1946, chairman of the JCAE whenever Democrats controlled Congress (1946, and 1949–52), until his death. Chairman of the JCAE during detection of the first Soviet atomic bomb, the debate over the hydrogen bomb, and the discovery of Klaus Fuchs as a spy.
Bourke Hickenlooper (R-IA), 1946–68: Ranking senator throughout much of its early history; chairman of the JCAE from 1947 to 1948. In 1949, he led a campaign accusing AEC chairman David E. Lilienthal of "incredible mismanagement" of the US nuclear complex.

Committee members, 1946–1977
The joint committee had equal representation between both the House and Senate, with 5 majority and 4 minority members from each house. The committee was chaired by a senator from the majority party until the 83rd Congress, when the chairmanship began to alternate between a majority representative and majority senator.

79th Congress, 1946

80th Congress, 1947–1949

81st Congress, 1949–1951

82nd Congress, 1951–1953

83rd Congress, 1953–1955

84th Congress, 1955–1957

85th Congress, 1957–1959

86th Congress, 1959–1961

87th Congress, 1961–1963

88th Congress, 1963–1965

89th Congress, 1965–1967

90th Congress, 1967–1969

91st Congress, 1969–1971

92nd Congress, 1971–1973

93rd Congress, 1973–1975

94th Congress, 1975–1977

95th Congress, 1977

Staff members
William L. Borden, executive director of staff, 1949–1953: Unusually powerful and influential staff figure who advocated for nuclear weapons development in the United States government.  Most known for sending a letter that led to the Oppenheimer security hearing.

See also
Immigration and Naturalization Service v. Chadha

References

External links
Library.stanford.edu: Joint Committee on Atomic Energy Digital Library — hosted by Stanford University.

Governmental nuclear organizations
Atomic Energy
Congress
Congress
Congress
Congress